The Colt M1878 is a double-action revolver that was manufactured by Colt's Manufacturing Company from 1878 to 1907. It is often referred to as the "Frontier" or the "Double Action Army" revolver. A total of 51,210 Model 1878 revolvers were manufactured from 1878 to 1907, including 4,600 for the US Ordnance Department. These are known as the "Philippine" or "Alaskan" models.

History
Samuel Colt experimented with double-action revolver systems, but he considered them to be unreliable. After Colt's patent expired in 1857, other manufacturers began producing double-action revolvers, but Colt's Manufacturing did not manufacture its own double-action revolver until 1877, twenty years after the patent had expired.

The M1878 was designed by William Mason, Colt's factory manager and Charles Brinckerhoff Richards, Superintendent of Engineering. It was similar in design to the Colt Model 1877. The Model 1878 had a larger frame, and is therefore sometimes referred to as the "large frame" double-action revolver, while the Model 1877 is likewise referred to as the "small frame" double-action revolver. The Model 1878 was considered a more robust and reliable design than the Model 1877.

Design and features
The design of the Model 1878 was based on the Model 1877, which in turn was based heavily on the design of the earlier Colt Single Action Army revolver. A strut is added to connect the trigger movement to the hammer. The top of the trigger slips beyond the strut so that the hammer will stay in full cock if it is pulled back manually.

The Model 1878 had a larger frame than the Model 1877, which allowed it to fire larger and more powerful cartridges such as the .45 Colt and .44-40, and used the same barrel & ejector parts as the Single Action Army revolver and a very similar cylinder. At one time, the factory modified Model 1878 cylinders for use in single-action revolvers in an attempt to use up spare parts.

Variants
The Model 1878 was available in .32-20, .38 Colt, .38-40, .41 Colt, .44-40, .455 Webley, .45 Colt, and .476 Eley. The most popular calibers were .44-40 and .45 Colt.

Standard grips were black checkered hard rubber but some early revolvers were produced with checkered walnut grips. Barrel lengths available were 3, 3-1/2, 4, 4-3/4, 5-1/2, and  inches. Revolvers with 4-inch and shorter barrels did not have an ejector.

In 1902, 4,600 Model 1878 revolvers were produced for a U.S. Army contract. They were intended to equip the Philippine Constabulary under Brigadier General Henry T. Allen in the Philippine Insurrection. These revolvers had 6-inch barrels, hard rubber grips, and were chambered for the .45 Colt round. They had strengthened mainsprings and longer triggers to give the user more leverage, resulting in larger trigger guards. The strengthened mainspring was necessary to fire the .45 Government rounds which had a less sensitive primer compared to the civilian .45 LC ammunition. Many people have incorrectly assumed that this was to allow the revolver to be operated while wearing gloves, so "Alaskan Model" is a misnomer. These revolvers are unofficially designated the Model 1902 (M1902).

References

External links

The Colt Revolver in the American West—Double Action Frontier

Colt revolvers
.45 Colt firearms
Early revolvers
Double-action revolvers
Guns of the American West
Military revolvers

de:Colt Model 1878